A total lunar eclipse took place on Saturday, December 19, 1964. A shallow total eclipse saw the Moon in relative darkness for 58 minutes and 54 seconds. The Moon was 17% of its diameter into the Earth's umbral shadow, and should have been significantly darkened. The partial eclipse lasted for 3 hours and 16 minutes in total.  The eclipse afforded astrophysicist J. M. Saari the opportunity to make infrared pyrometric scans of the lunar surface with improved equipment, following up on Richard W. Shorthill's discovery of "hot spots" in the Tycho crater during the March 13, 1960 eclipse.

Visibility

Related lunar eclipses

Lunar year series

See also
List of lunar eclipses
List of 20th-century lunar eclipses

Notes

External links

1964-12
1964 in science
December 1964 events